HTMS Thonburi was a coastal defence ship of the Royal Thai Navy.

Design 

Thonburi and her sister ship, were designed following the incorporation of the earlier s into the Siamese Navy in the 1920s. The Rattanakosindra class were British-built ships which featured six-inch guns in two turrets and light armor. Under Plaek Pibulsonggram's command, the Siamese Navy began a series of modernization efforts. Priorities for the navy consisted of protecting the extensive Thai coastline, and coastal gunboats were viewed as the best resource. Several foreign firms from European countries offered a variety of designs, but in the end the Japanese company Kawasaki won the tender.

The new vessels were basically larger versions of the earlier Rattanakosindra ships. The ships were laid down at Kawasaki's facilities in 1936, and Thonburi was launched on 31 July 1937. The resulting "battleships", as they were referred to in Siam at the time, displaced 2,265 tons, featured increased armor protection (protecting machinery and gun turrets), and were powered by twin diesels produced by MAN of Germany.

Armament consisted of four /50 calibre guns mounted in two twin turrets. In fact, they were second hand guns left over from Japanese modernization efforts. It is unknown which ships the guns came from, but the carrier Kaga is a possible donor. A tower above the bridge featured a fire control tower with a gun director sitting on top to direct the  guns. Additional armament consisted of four 3-inch and four 40-mm guns.

The new ships were enthusiastically received by the Royal Thai Navy. Purchasing further vessels of the type was considered by the government, but ultimately it was decided to purchase two Italian-built light cruisers in 1938. Both ships were seized by Italy in 1941 before construction had finished (they were never completed), leaving Thonburi and Sri Ayudhya as the most powerful combatants in Thai service.

Service 

Both ships of the class had entered service by the time hostilities had broken out in Europe during the Second World War. Thonburi engaged a French squadron in the Battle of Koh Chang on 17 January 1941. The resulting battle was nothing short of a massive defeat, as the Thai ship was severely damaged by fire from the French cruiser Lamotte-Picquet, fires spread out of control and other ships were unable to connect to her fire suppression systems due to not having adaptors for the differently sized pipes so she was towed to Laem Ngop to be beached in order to prevent her sinking. She would capsize a few hours after the order to abandon ship was given. Thonburi was later raised and attempts were made to repair the extensive damage, though she would never sail under her own power again. She would continue to serve the navy as a training vessel with her secondary battery being removed until being stricken in 1959. Part of her bridge and forward gun turret are preserved as a memorial at the Royal Thai Naval Academy with other relics from her such as the remains of her bow garuda and bell would be spread around the country in various museums. Interestingly, there are two bells on display at two different museums which claim to be the real bell of the Thonburi. Which one is the genuine article or if she ever had two bells are unclear. Sri Ayudhya had a more unfortunate fate, being sunk in the Manhattan Rebellion of 1951.

References

Coastal defence ships of the Royal Thai Navy
Ships built by Kawasaki Heavy Industries
1938 ships
Maritime incidents in January 1941
World War II coastal defence ships
Japan–Thailand military relations